Steven Joseph Chabot (born January 22, 1953) is an American politician and lawyer who represented  in the United States House of Representatives from 1995 to 2009 and again from 2011 to 2023. A member of the Republican Party, he lost his 2022 reelection bid to Democrat Greg Landsman.

Early life, education, and pre-political career
Chabot was born in 1953 in Cincinnati, Ohio, the son of Gerard Joseph and Doris Leona (née Tilley) Chabot; paternally, he is of French-Canadian descent. He graduated from La Salle High School in Cincinnati in 1971, and then from the College of William and Mary in 1975, earning a Bachelor of Arts in physical education. He went on to obtain a Juris Doctor degree from Northern Kentucky University Salmon P. Chase College of Law in 1978. He worked as an elementary school teacher in 1975–76 while taking law classes at night. Chabot also taught political science at the University of Cincinnati and chaired the Boy Scouts of Cincinnati.

As a practicing attorney from 1978 to 1994, Chabot handled domestic disputes and the drafting of wills as a sole practitioner. He operated out of a small law office in Westwood.

Early political career
Chabot ran unsuccessfully for the Cincinnati City Council as an independent candidate in 1979 and as a Republican in 1983. He won a seat in 1985 as a Republican and was reelected for the next four years. In 1988, he ran for the U.S. House of Representatives against seven-term incumbent Democrat Tom Luken, who defeated him, 56–44%. In 1990 he was appointed a Commissioner of Hamilton County, Ohio, and was elected later that year and again in 1992, holding that office until 1994.

U.S. House of Representatives

Elections

In 1994, Chabot ran for the U.S. House again and defeated Democratic incumbent David S. Mann of Ohio's 1st congressional district, 56%–44%. In 1996, he defeated Democrat Mark Longabaugh, a member of the Cincinnati City Council, 54%–43%. In 1998, he defeated Cincinnati Mayor Roxanne Qualls, 53% to 47%. In the series of debates during that campaign, Qualls criticized Chabot for not funneling enough federal spending to his home district. Chabot countered that he would not support "wasteful or unnecessary" federal programs. In 2000, he defeated City Councilman John Cranley 53–44%. In 2002, he defeated Greg Harris with 65% of the vote. In 2004, he defeated Harris again, with 60% of the vote.

2006 

Chabot defeated Democratic challenger John Cranley again, this time by a narrower margin of 52–48%.

2008 

Chabot lost to State Representative Steve Driehaus, 52%–48%.

2010 

In a rematch, Chabot defeated Driehaus, Libertarian Jim Berns, and Green Party nominee Richard Stevenson. Chabot won with 52% of the vote.

2012 

Chabot defeated Democratic nominee Jeff Sinnard, 58%–38%, with Green nominee Rich Stevenson and Libertarian nominee Jim Berns picking up the balance. He was helped by the 2010 round of redistricting, which shifted the majority of heavily Republican Warren County to the 1st Congressional District.

2014 

Chabot defeated Democratic nominee Fred Kundrata, 63%–37%.

2016 

Chabot defeated Democratic nominee Michele Young, 59%–41%.

2018 

Chabot defeated Democratic nominee Aftab Pureval, 51%–48%. Libertarian nominee Dirk Kubala took the remainder of the vote.

2020 

Chabot defeated Democratic nominee Kate Schroder, 52%–45%. Libertarian nominee Kevin David Kahn took the remainder of the vote.

2022 

Chabot's district became considerably more Democratic in redistricting, as it afterwards included the entire city of Cincinnati. He lost 52%–47% to Democratic nominee Greg Landsman, a member of the Cincinnati City Council, ending Chabot's nearly three decade tenure in congress. Afterwards, Chabot stated that he would not run for the seat in 2024.

Tenure

 

In 1999, Chabot served as one of the House managers in the impeachment trial of Bill Clinton.

On December 18, 2019, Chabot voted against both articles of impeachment against President Donald Trump. Of the 195 Republicans who voted, 185 voted against both articles and 10 Republicans  voted for impeachment.

On January 7, 2021, Chabot objected to the certification of the 2020 US presidential election results in Congress based on false claims of voter fraud.

In March 2021, he voted against the American Rescue Plan Act of 2021.

Committee assignments
 Committee on Foreign Affairs
Subcommittee on Asia and the Pacific
 Subcommittee on the Middle East and South Asia
 Committee on the Judiciary
 Subcommittee on the Constitution
 Subcommittee on Intellectual Property, Competition, and the Internet
 Committee on Small Business

Caucus memberships
Congressional Taiwan Caucus (co-chair)
 U.S.-Japan Caucus
House Baltic Caucus
House Cambodia Caucus
Republican Study Committee

Electoral history

*Write-in and minor candidate notes: In 2004, Rich Stevenson received 198 votes. In 2008, Eric Wilson received 85 votes and Rich Stevenson received 67 votes. In 2020, Kiumars Kiani received 11 votes.

Political positions

During the presidency of Donald Trump, Chabot voted in line with Trump's stated position 93.1% of the time. As of August 2022, Chabot had voted in line with Joe Biden's stated position 16.4% of the time.

Health care
Chabot authored a bill prohibiting a form of late-term abortion called partial-birth abortion, referred to in some medical literature by its less common name of intact dilation and extraction. President George W. Bush signed the bill into law on November 5, 2003.

Chabot favors repealing the Affordable Care Act (Obamacare). He favors market-based reforms that he claims will offer American families more lower-cost options. He supported the March 2017 version of the American Health Care Act, the GOP's replacement for Obamacare. On May 4, 2017, Chabot voted to repeal the Affordable Care Act and pass the American Health Care Act.

Environment
On the topic of man-made climate change, Chabot has said, "the evidence concerning man-made climate change is far from conclusive". He has said cap-and-trade is an "extreme proposal" that would harm the economy.

Other
In 1999, Chabot was one of the managers appointed to conduct the impeachment proceedings of President Bill Clinton.

On August 22, 2011, Chabot asked Cincinnati police to confiscate cameras being used by private citizens to record a town-hall meeting, even as media television cameras recorded the incident. YouTube videos of the incident provided wide awareness of it, and the participating police officer was later disciplined.

In 2002, Chabot advocated teaching intelligent design alongside the theory of evolution by natural selection in Ohio high schools.

Chabot has called for ending logging subsidies in the Tongass National Forest, and promoted relations with Taiwan. In 2002, he helped spearhead the local campaign against building a light rail system in Hamilton County.

As of 2016, Chabot had traveled on congressional fact-finding missions to 46 countries at a cost of $200,000.

Personal life
Chabot lives with his wife Donna in Westwood. They have two children and a grandson.

References

External links

 
 
 
 Steve Chabot at On the Issues

|-

|-

|-

|-

|-

1953 births
20th-century American politicians
21st-century American politicians
College of William & Mary alumni
County commissioners in Ohio
Living people
Politicians from Cincinnati
Republican Party members of the United States House of Representatives from Ohio
Salmon P. Chase College of Law alumni